Klaus Franke (born 23 May 1948) is a retired German football defender.

References

External links
 

1948 births
Living people
German footballers
Bundesliga players
VfL Bochum players
Place of birth missing (living people)
Association football defenders
Footballers from Essen
West German footballers